Lalabad may refer to various places in Iran:

Lalabad, Lorestan
Lalabad-e Hoseyn-e Qolikhani, Kermanshah Province
Lalabad-e Kol Kol 1, Kermanshah Province
Lalabad-e Kol Kol 2, Kermanshah Province
Lalabad-e Olya, Kermanshah Province
Lalabad-e Seyyed Jafari, Kermanshah Province
Lalabad-e Seyyed Sadeq, Kermanshah Province
Lalabad, Sistan and Baluchestan
Lalabad-e Huti, Sistan and Baluchestan Province
Lalabad, Yazd